Păulești is a commune in Prahova County, Muntenia, Romania. It is composed of four villages: Cocoșești, Găgeni, Păulești and Păuleștii Noi.

Notes

Further reading 

 4,500 and 1,000 year old tombs have been discovered in Paulesti, Romania

External links 

 4,500 and 1,000 year old tombs have been discovered in Paulesti, Romania

Communes in Prahova County
Localities in Muntenia